The 1940–41 Panhellenic Championship never finished, because of the WW2. The only championships that started and went on until 28 October 1940, when the Greco-Italian War started, were the Athenian, Piraeus' and Macedonian championship. The point system was: Win: 3 points - Draw: 2 points - Loss: 1 point.

Qualification round

Athens Football Clubs Association

Suspended 27 October 1940.

Piraeus Football Clubs Association

Suspended 27 October 1940.

Macedonia Football Clubs Association

Suspended 27 October 1940.

Final round

Not held.

References

1940–41 in Greek football
1940-41
Greece